Clelia plumbea is a species of rear-fanged snake in the family Dipsadidae. The species is endemic to South America.

Geographic range
C. plumbea is found in Brazil and Paraguay.

References

Further reading
Wied-Neuwied M (1820). Reise nach Brasilien in den Jahren 1815 bis 1817. Erster Band [Volume 1]. Frankfurt am Main: H.L. Brönner. xxxvi + 580 pp. + appendices. (Coluber plumbeus, new species, p. 95). (in German).

Mussuranas
Clelia
Snakes of South America
Reptiles of Brazil
Reptiles of Paraguay
Reptiles described in 1820